Jackass is an American reality comedy television series created by Jeff Tremaine, Spike Jonze, and Johnny Knoxville. It originally aired for three short seasons on MTV between October 2000 and August 2001, with reruns extending into 2002. The show featured a cast of nine friends carrying out stunts and pranks on each other and the public. The cast included Johnny Knoxville, Bam Margera, Chris Pontius, Dave England, Ryan Dunn, Steve-O, Jason "Wee Man" Acuña, Ehren McGhehey and Preston Lacy.

The show was controversial due to its perceived indecency and potential encouragement of dangerous behavior. After MTV ended Jackass broadcasts in 2002, it grew into a media franchise, which includes the spin-offs Wildboyz, Viva La Bam, Homewrecker, Blastazoid, Bam's Unholy Union, Dr. Steve-O, Bam's World Domination, and Bam's Bad Ass Game Show; nine feature films released by Paramount Pictures, four with expanded DVD versions; a video game; a mobile game, a DVD of unreleased bits not used in the original TV show, a short-lived website featuring blogs and videos, merchandise, and several other videos released by various other means. The show placed 68th on Entertainment Weekly "New TV Classics" list, and is a significant part in 2000s American popular culture.

History

Background

Origins and casting 
In the late 1990s, aspiring actor and writer Johnny Knoxville had moved from Knoxville, Tennessee to Los Angeles, California, and landed work in commercials in order to support his wife and infant daughter. Among his ideas was to produce an article that involved testing various self-defense equipment on himself as a homage to his hero, gonzo journalist Hunter S. Thompson. The magazines that contacted him refused to cover the story due to liability concerns. However, in 1996, Knoxville was contacted by Big Brother, a skateboarding magazine for which Jeff Tremaine was an editor, and convinced Knoxville to do the stunt and film it. The stunt featured Knoxville testing out pepper spray, a stun gun, a taser, and a .38 caliber gun with a bulletproof vest, with the gun stunt only being included in the Big Brother video entitled Number Two, which also featured an appearance by future Jackass cast member Jason "Wee Man" Acuña. Other contributors to Big Brother at this time were Chris Pontius and Dave England, who went on to become a part of the Jackass crew; Dimitry Elyashkevich, who became the show's main cinematographer; Rick Kosick, who became a cameraman; and Sean Cliver, who became the show's main photographer.

Around this time, up-and-coming professional skateboarder Bam Margera was filming his family and friends from his hometown of West Chester, Pennsylvania. Collectively known as the CKY crew (short for "Camp Kill Yourself"), these home videos were ultimately compiled and released as part of the CKY video series. The videos featured stunts, pranks, and skateboarding with a cast that primarily included Bam, Ryan Dunn, Brandon DiCamillo, Raab Himself, Rake Yohn and Margera's family; his mother April, his father Phil, his uncle Don Vito, and his older brother and CKY drummer Jess. Like the Big Brother videos, the CKY releases quickly became a cult hit and attracted the attention of Tremaine, who saw the second CKY video, CKY2K, and flew Margera to Los Angeles to meet with him. 

The video convinced Tremaine that the CKY group would fit perfectly with the idea of a stunt and prank television show that he, Knoxville, and Spike Jonze had been planning. After demo footage had been shot and pitched to several networks, Saturday Night Live made an offer to have the crew be a recurring segment on the show. The offer was rejected, and a subsequent bidding war between Comedy Central, FX, and MTV resulted in the three accepting a deal from the latter for a half-hour weekly show and greater creative control. Knoxville, Tremaine, and Jonze are credited as executive producers. Van Toffler, president of MTV, said: "We just knew there were a bunch of knuckleheads out there who had a very high tolerance for stupidity and pain."

Soon after the MTV deal, Tremaine got in touch with periodic contributor to Big Brother Steve-O, who was working as a clown at a local Florida flea market, and had him film videos of his stunts for the television show, but none of the stunts were cleared by MTV management. Some time later, Dave England suggested and brought in his friend Ehren McGhehey, a fellow Oregon resident and extreme stunt participant. Preston Lacy would be the last of the original cast to join, after he and Knoxville previously worked together with Knoxville's ex-wife's clothing line. Knoxville told Preston that he was making a new TV show and asked him if he could potentially write some ideas. Knoxville then convinced Preston to perform the stunts himself.

Jackass officially debuted on October 1, 2000. After the second episode aired, MTV gained its highest Sunday ratings in its history, drawing 2.4 million viewers among 12 to 34-year-olds, its target demographic.

Finale 
In a 2001 interview with Rolling Stone, Knoxville questioned how long the MTV show would and could last, and soon after announced that the series would end after its third season aired. He also stated discontent with MTV and the censors, who, from the start of season two, increasingly gave notes regarding what the show could and could not depict. In addition, Steve-O claimed that the cast salaries paid by MTV were meager at best. Because of problems with MTV's standards and practices department, the Jackass crew did not attempt to create a finale to bring the show to a close.

Cast

Main series

Controversies 
At the time of its first broadcast in 2000, Jackass frequently featured warnings and disclaimers noting that the stunts performed were very dangerous and should not be imitated. Such warnings not only appeared before and after each program and after each commercial break, but also in a "crawl" that ran along the bottom of the screen during some especially risky stunts, as well as showing their "skull and crutches" logo at the bottom right of the screen to symbolize the stunt performed as risky. Nevertheless, the program was blamed for a number of deaths and injuries involving teens and children recreating the stunts.

On February 7, 2001, Connecticut senator Joe Lieberman sent a letter to MTV's parent company Viacom urging the company to take greater responsibility for its programming and to do more to help parents protect their children. MTV responded to the criticism by canceling all airings of Jackass before 10 p.m., but Lieberman's continual campaign against the show  led to MTV ultimately refusing to air repeats of the later episodes, a move which angered the cast and production crew of the series who were furious with MTV's "caving into Lieberman's demands".

In 2002, a Montana man named Jack Ass sued MTV for $10 million, claiming that the show was plagiarizing his name. Jack Ass, whose birth name was Bob Craft (died  2003), changed his name in 1997 to raise awareness for drunk driving, after his brother and friend were tragically killed in a car accident. Johnny Knoxville, one of the show's creators, refuted the lawsuit stating "What could be more American than just suing the living shit out of someone for no reason at all?"

On November 23, 2012, Matt-Dillion Shannon, an 18-year-old from Napier, New Zealand, was sentenced to three years in prison on a charge of causing grievous bodily harm for his role in the August 2011 dousing of a 16-year-old with gasoline and setting him on fire. Shannon's lawyer claimed that this act was inspired by the Jackass series, despite the fact that no such stunt ever aired, nor was even attempted, on the show.

Home media 
On December 6, 2005, MTV released a four disc DVD collection entitled Jackass: The Box Set. This set does not contain the three complete seasons as they originally aired, but rather recompilations, each including various stunts from all three seasons, arranged into 3 volumes of "episodes". There are also additional features, such as a commentary track by the cast and crew for numerous stunts. The fourth disc includes additional bonus material, such as the crew's trip to the Gumball 3000 rally (The only 1-hour long episode in the show's history); a special "Where Are They Now?" documentary; MTV Cribs: Jackass Edition, featuring segments compiled from various Cribs episodes spotlighting Chris Pontius, Steve-O, Bam Margera, and Ryan Dunn; as well as appearances by the crew at the 2002 MTV Video Music Awards and the 2002 MTV Latin America Video Music Awards. The set also contains a 48-page collector's booklet of rare photos and covers the history of the show, as well as various inside stories of certain stunts and moments from the show.

The second and third volumes of this box set had previously been released separately on December 10, 2002, two months after Jackass: The Movie was released in theaters. The first volume was released by itself on January 23, 2006. The fourth "bonus disc" has never been released separately and is only included with the box set.

Another compilation of stunts from the television series was released on October 11, 2009 entitled Jackass: The Lost Tapes. Again being arranged into individual segments rather than episodes, this collection features all the remaining stunts from the show that, for one reason or another, weren't included in the original box set, such as "Self Defense Test"; "Stun Collar"; "Fast Food Football"; "Roller Jump"; and "Satan vs. God". In addition to the previously unreleased segments, this collection also includes stunts that were filmed for the TV series, but never aired, primarily due to censorship reasons. The DVD's bonus features include the original cold opens from every televised episode of Jackass, the original credit montages from each televised episode, and an inside look at the short-lived website jackassworld.com, featuring various skits.

Beginning in 2013, various other box sets have been released in the USA and UK that combine the original box set, with or without the bonus disc (Gumball Rally 3000, etc), with the lost tapes disc, and often with all the movies released up to that point (5 or 7), in their unrated expanded versions.

Spin-offs and life after Jackass 
After the TV series ended, each member of the cast found new work in movies and/or television, each achieving their own degree of success. Knoxville pursued a career as an actor, appearing in such films as the 2004 remake of Walking Tall, The Dukes of Hazzard, Men in Black II, The Ringer, A Dirty Shame, Big Trouble, Coyote Ugly, The Last Stand, Teenage Mutant Ninja Turtles, and Skiptrace.

Margera and the CKY crew were given their own spin-off show in 2003 called Viva La Bam, which followed Margera and his family, who were often made the victim of the clique's practical jokes. Bam and the crew also hosted a radio show from 2004 until 2013 called Radio Bam on Sirius XM. Margera was also the primary focus of the show Bam's Unholy Union, which followed him and his then-fiancé Missy Rothstein in the run-up to their wedding, while Brandon DiCamillo and Rake Yohn were featured in Blastazoid, a short-lived show about video games.

When Viva La Bam finished its run, Ryan Dunn, who was part of Bam's CKY crew on Viva La Bam, was given his own show Homewrecker, in which he found revenge for helpless victims of practical jokes by renovating the prankster's room according to the original incident. The show only lasted one season. On June 20, 2011, Dunn was tragically killed in a car crash while driving intoxicated in Pennsylvania.

Chris Pontius and Steve-O were also given their own spin-off show in 2003 entitled Wildboyz. Unlike Jackass and Viva La Bam, Wildboyz rejected the standard formula of practical jokes and instead featured the two traveling the world in search of wild and exotic animals. Directed by Jackass director Jeff Tremaine, Wildboyz frequently featured guest appearances by fellow Jackasses Johnny Knoxville and Wee Man, as well as recurring Jackass guests Loomis Fall, Manny Puig, Tony Hawk, and Mat Hoffman.

One year after Jackass Number Two was released, Steve-O was given a new spin-off entitled Dr. Steve-O, which premiered in 2007 on the USA Network. The show followed Steve-O as he acted as a doctor to help men overcome their fears, thus the tagline created by Steve-O, "Turning wussies into men." In every episode, Dr. Steve-O helped three different men, and made them complete three challenges to overcome their fears.

Two days before Jackass 3D premiered in theaters, Bam Margera and Ryan Dunn starred in a half-hour TV special titled Bam's World Domination. In this special, Bam and Dunn, along with pro skateboarder Tim O'Connor, participated in The Tough Guy Competition. This special aired on SpikeTV.

After Jackass Presents: Bad Grandpa was released, Bam Margera created a new spin-off entitled Bam's Bad Ass Game Show, which aired on TBS in 2014. Bam hosted this game show, along with co-hosts Brandon Novak, Tim O'Connor, and Seth Meisterman, in which contestants were instructed to perform a series of stunts while competing against each other, in the hopes of winning the grand prize of $10,000.

Sean "Poopies" McInerney, one of the new cast members of Jackass Forever, will have a spin-off titled What Not To Do, which will air on Discovery+.

Films

Jackass: The Movie (2002) 

After the show went off the air, the cast reunited in 2002 to film what they believed would be the finale of Jackass: a full-length motion picture version of the show entitled Jackass: The Movie. The cast made it clear that the film was their "farewell" to the fans of the show, and with the franchise taking the movie format, the cast and crew were now allowed to avoid the censors, showing more vulgar stunts than the ones featured on the TV show. Despite earlier disagreements, MTV Films assisted in the film's distribution.

The film, shot on a budget of just $5 million, went on to gross over $60 million in the United States alone, and finished in the #1 spot at the box office during its debut weekend.

Jackass Number Two (2006) 

With the release of Jackass: The Movie, director Tremaine and the rest of the cast believed that Jackass was finished, and there would be no further projects under the franchise. However, during the final season of Wildboyz, Knoxville joined his former castmates Pontius and Steve-O on various expeditions around the world. It was said that Knoxville went so far out during the filming of the show that Tremaine pulled him aside and said "If you're willing to go this all out, why not get all the guys together and shoot another movie?" Knoxville agreed, and with both Viva La Bam and Wildboyz finishing up their runs, the entire cast was available to reunite and film the sequel.

Jackass Number Two was released on September 22, 2006, produced by MTV Films and distributed by Paramount Pictures. As was the case with its predecessor, Jackass Number Two topped the box office in its debut weekend, earning $29.01 million. Footage for several stunts featured Bam Margera's uncle Vincent "Don Vito" Margera, but this was removed from the theatrical and DVD release due to his arrest and conviction on two counts of sexual assault on a minor.

On September 7, 2006, MTV featured a half-hour documentary entitled The Making of Jackass: Number Two. When asked if the film meant the end of Jackass, cast member Steve-O jokingly commented that the people who made money from the franchise still wanted more money, hinting that the cast would still continue the franchise in one form or another. At the conclusion of the documentary, Johnny Knoxville reveals that he "had a hard time letting go" because he is "so hooked on doing stunts." Cameraman Dimitry Elyashkevich confirmed that weeks after the film, Knoxville was so desperate to shoot that he would film himself running into street signs just for the sake of additional footage.

Jackass 2.5 (2007) 

On September 5, 2007, Bam Margera announced the release of Jackass 2.5 on The Howard Stern Show, a compilation film of stunts that, for one reason or another, did not make it to Jackass: Number Two. The DVD was released on December 26, 2007. Special features on the DVD include the making of Jackass 2.5, the making of Jackass: The Game, deleted scenes, and a photo gallery.

Jackass Presents: Mat Hoffman's Tribute to Evel Knievel (2008) 

On May 27, 2008, a direct-to-DVD Jackass film was released by Dickhouse Productions. The film is a tribute to the stuntman Evel Knievel, who died on November 30, 2007, one year before the film's release.

Jackass 3D (2010) 

In an August 2009 interview with The Times-Picayune, Knoxville, on the topic of Steve-O's recovery and rehabilitation, said, "He's taking to sobriety like he took to drugs and alcohol, I'm very proud of him. I think we'll see him doing some stuff here really soon. As a matter of fact, I know we are." He later stated "Something's coming. We're pretty excited." Later, he added, "I think it'll be a big year next year, but I don't want to talk about it yet ..."

In September 2009, Margera revealed to Iltalehti, a Finnish newspaper, that Jackass 3 would be made and filmed in places like Mongolia, South Africa and Finland as well as the United States beginning in January 2010. He then confirmed it again during a broadcast of Radio Bam on September 21, 2009. In early December, Knoxville confirmed that Jackass 3 was being made. In April 2010, a brief blurb about Jackass 3D, titled "gone filmin, appeared on the Jackassworld website. It went on to state: "Thanks for the support the past two years. To keep abreast and adick of all things related to the world of jackass and Dickhouse (including the currently in production flick Jackass 3D), follow us on Facebook and Twitter."

In late July 2010, Paramount and MTV screened the first footage from Jackass 3D at a special event during Comic-Con 2010 in its 3D format. The event allowed fans to meet the Jackass crew. Then in August 2010, the official trailer was aired on MTV.

Jackass 3D was released in American movie theaters on October 15, 2010. On opening weekend, the movie made an estimated $50 million in 3,081 theaters, outperforming predictions it would earn $30 million and breaking the record for the most successful fall opening ever, which was previously held by Scary Movie 3.

Jackass 3.5 (2011) 

Jackass 3.5 was released in June 2011 with unused footage shot during the filming of Jackass 3D. The first trailer was released online on January 27, 2011, and the feature-length movie was released on VOD and DVD on June 14, 2011, and the entire film was streamed in weekly segments on Joost, starting April 1, 2011.

Jackass Presents: Bad Grandpa (2013) 

In March 2012, Knoxville discussed the possibility of a fourth film, saying "we're keeping our mind open" and "I've got 50–60 ideas on top of all the stuff we didn't get to shoot." Then in June 2012, it was reported Paramount "registered several domains for a film that would be called Bad Grandpa."

During Margera's September 18, 2012, interview on The Howard Stern Show about Jackass, he said: "There's going to be a whole movie about Knoxville's grandpa character."

Bad Grandpa was officially announced in July 2013 and released on October 25, 2013, exactly 11 years after the release of Jackass: The Movie. It was the first film in the series to be nominated for an Academy Award; it lost the Best Makeup and Hairstyling award to Dallas Buyers Club.

Jackass Presents: Bad Grandpa.5 (2014) 
Jackass Presents: Bad Grandpa.5 is a version of Bad Grandpa that adds over 40 minutes of unused footage, additional outtakes, and interviews. It premiered June 15, 2014 on MTV, and was released on DVD and Blu-ray July 8, 2014.

Jackass Forever (2022) 

In a 2018 interview, Knoxville said that he was open to making a fourth Jackass film that may feature some new cast members, "just to bring in some fresh blood into it." He said that he had continued to write ideas for a Jackass film and that "a ton" have been set aside should the project receive the green-light. In July 2019, former cast member Chris Raab said that he had interviewed the Jackass crew on his Bathroom Break podcast and noted that everyone was still open to a fourth film should Knoxville, Tremaine, and Spike Jonze agree. On December 19, 2019, Paramount confirmed that a fourth Jackass film was set for production and scheduled for release on March 5, 2021. In April 2020, the film's release date was rescheduled to July 2, 2021. In July 2020, due to the ongoing COVID-19 pandemic, the film was rescheduled once again to September 3, 2021. In April 2021, Paramount in a major reshuffle, moved the release date again to October 22, 2021. Principal photography started on March 3, 2020, and shut down on March 15, 2020 because of the COVID-19 pandemic. Filming resumed 7 months later on October 19, 2020. Paramount officially released the movie in the United States on February 4, 2022.

Jackass 4.5 (2022) 

Jackass 4.5 is compiled from outtakes, behind-the-scenes footage, and unused material shot during the filming of Jackass Forever, along with later interviews with the cast and crew members. It was released on Netflix on May 20, 2022, and will remain there until 2024, after which it will be released on Paramount+.

Television

Jackass Backyard BBQ (2002) 
Jackass Backyard BBQ is a TV special that features the entire Jackass cast promoting the first Jackass movie. Dave England did not appear in this special, but archival footage of him is shown. It features celebrity guest appearances from Andrew W.K., Tré Cool, Rivers Cuomo, Eric Koston, Lara Flynn Boyle, Danny Masterson, and Slash. It premiered on MTV in July, 2002.

Jackassworld.com: 24 Hour Takeover (2008) 

On February 23, 2008, MTV held the TV special, Jackassworld.com: 24 Hour Takeover, to coincide with the official launch of Jackassworld.com. The special allowed the core members of Jackass to take over MTV and its studios for 24 hours, broadcasting new pranks and stunts, along with a tribute to stunt man Evel Knievel shot days before.

A Tribute to Ryan Dunn (2011) 
A Tribute to Ryan Dunn is a TV movie documentary which aired on November 28, 2011. The film chronicles the life of former cast member Ryan Dunn, who died on June 20, 2011. It features interviews from Dunn's family members, the Jackass cast and crew, and some of the CKY crew members. Never-before-released footage of Dunn was also shown in this documentary.

Jackass Shark Week (2021 & 2022) 
On July 11, 2021, during Shark Week, the Discovery Channel aired Jackass Shark Week.  It featured Jackass cast members Johnny Knoxville, Steve-O, Chris Pontius, and new cast members Sean "Poopies" McInerney and Jasper Dolphin, with Jeff Tremaine and Trip Taylor serving as executive producers, and Dimitry Elyashkevich as camera operator. This Shark Week episode marks the first time ever someone got bit on the show.

On June 15, 2022, Chris Pontius announced that they will be doing another Jackass Shark Week special. It featured Johnny Knoxville, Chris Pontius, Wee Man, Sean "Poopies" McInerney, Zach Holmes, Jasper Dolphin, and his dad Compston "Dark Shark" Wilson. It aired on July 24, 2022 on the Discovery Channel.

Crew

Reception

Box office performance

Critical and public response

Other media

Video games

Jackass: The Game (2007) 

Jackass: The Game was released on September 24, 2007. It was developed under a license by Sidhe Interactive in Wellington, New Zealand, for the PlayStation 2, PlayStation Portable and Nintendo DS. The game was first shown at the 2006 E3 behind closed doors. It is mentioned in the Jackass Number Two commentary: when discussing the stunt where several members get punched in the face by a spring-loaded boxing glove hidden behind a fake valentine on a wall, the commentator says the cast members had just come upstairs from shooting a promo for the video game. Knoxville and other members of the Jackass team also provided stunt ideas to the developer based on unused stunts from the show. A trailer and the cover art was released in June 2007 on the game's official website. All main characters of the show were featured as playable, except for Bam Margera, whose contractual obligations to Neversoft, makers of the Tony Hawk's franchise, prevented him from appearing in any other video game.

Jackass Human Slingshot (2022) 
Jackass Human Slingshot is a mobile game available on Android and iOS, and was released on January 20, 2022. In this game, you play as Johnny Knoxville and get launched from a slingshot to get as much injuries as possible in order to progress. The game was developed by BBTV Interactive.

Trading cards

2022 Zerocool Jackass Trading Cards 
After Jackass Forever premiered in 2022, a Jackass trading card set was released. The set featured autographs of the Jackass Forever cast and crew, and several Jackass Forever guest stars. This set was unique in the sense that special numbered insert cards were given only to cast and crew members, so there was no way to get these extremely rare cards directly from boxes. The only way to get one was directly from one of the cast or crew members.

Related films

CKY (1999–2002) 

The CKY video series is a series of videos produced by Bam Margera and Brandon DiCamillo and other residents of West Chester, Pennsylvania. "CKY" stands for "Camp Kill Yourself". The series was part of the basis for what eventually became the Jackass TV series.

Don't Try This at Home: The Steve-O Video (2001–2004) 

Don't Try This at Home: The Steve-O Video is the first DVD by Steve-O, released in 2001. It mostly contains footage that couldn't be shown on related MTV show Jackass, due to censorship. It was followed by Don't Try This at Home Volume 2: The Tour (2002), Steve-O: Out on Bail (2003) and Steve-O: The Early Years (2004). The video series featured recurring guest appearances from the Jackass cast and crew, and from professional skateboarder Ryan Simonetti.

Haggard: The Movie (2003) 

Haggard: The Movie is an independent comedy film based on the story of how Ryan Dunn's girlfriend may have cheated on him. The film was financed, directed, produced, co-written, and edited by Bam Margera. The film stars Ryan Dunn, Jenn Rivell, Brandon DiCamillo, Bam Margera, Rake Yohn, and Raab Himself.

National Lampoon's TV: The Movie (2006) 

National Lampoon's TV: The Movie is a comedy film that was released in 2006 and features several cast members of Jackass including Steve-O, Preston Lacy, Wee Man, Chris Pontius, Ehren McGhehey and recurring Jackass guest Manny Puig. The film features parodies of many television shows, such as Fear Factor, Cops, MTV Cribs, The Six Million Dollar Man and Miami Vice.

3000 Miles (2007) 
3000 Miles is a documentary in which Bam Margera and Ryan Dunn, along with Tony Hawk, Mike Vallely, Mike Escamilla, and Dan Joyce from Dirty Sanchez, race 3000 miles around the world from London to Los Angeles in 8 days in the Gumball 3000 rally.

Bam Margera Presents: Where the #$&% Is Santa? (2008) 
Bam Margera Presents: Where the #$&% Is Santa? is a direct-to-video film about Bam Margera going on a quest to find Santa Claus with the help from Brandon Novak, his elder brother Jess, Chad I Ginsburg, Mark Hanna, Joe Frantz, Missy Rothstein, his parents Phil and April, Seth Meisterman, and his uncle Matt "Shitbirdz" Cole. Jarppi Leppälä and Jukka Hildén from The Dudesons also appear in this movie. If Bam doesn't succeed to find Santa, Mark the Bagger gets his wife Missy as a Christmas present.

Minghags (2009) 

Minghags is an independent comedy film that was released in 2009. It was directed, co-written, and edited by Bam Margera. It is a loose sequel to Haggard: The Movie. The film stars Bam Margera, Ryan Dunn, Brandon DiCamillo, Don Vito, Rake Yohn, Missy Rothstein, Brandon Novak, Mark the Bagger, Mark Hanna, and Angie Cuturic.

Steve-O: Guilty as Charged (2016) 
Steve-O: Guilty as Charged is Steve-O's first comedy special which was released on March 18, 2016. It features him performing various stunts in front of a live audience in a theatre in Austin, Texas, as well as him telling backstories of his career. This special premiered on Showtime.

Action Point (2018) 

Action Point is comedy film featuring Jackass cast members Johnny Knoxville and Chris Pontius released in 2018. Knoxville was inspired to make the film after seeing Matt Robertson's 2013 short documentary The Most Insane Amusement Park Ever, about Action Park, a theme park in New Jersey which was notorious for poorly designed, unsafe rides, in addition to employing underaged, undertrained and often under-the-influence staff. Similar to Bad Grandpa, the film features traditional Jackass-style stunts connected by a fictional narrative.

Steve-O: Gnarly (2020) 
Gnarly is Steve-O's second stand-up comedy special at the Gothic Theatre in Denver, Colorado. He presented stories, stunts and previously unseen footage to the audience. The special marks the first time the entire cast of Jackass reunited after the death of Ryan Dunn. It was released in 2020 and is available to watch on Steve-O's website.

See also

References

External links 
 
 
 
 

2000s American reality television series
2000 American television series debuts
2002 American television series endings
CKY
English-language television shows
Jackass (film series)
Jackass (TV series)
MTV original programming
Groups of entertainers
Television controversies in the United States
Television series by Dickhouse Productions
Television shows adapted into video games
Stunt television series
Practical jokes